A psalter is a volume containing the Book of Psalms, often with other devotional material bound in as well, such as a liturgical calendar and litany of the Saints. Until the emergence of the book of hours in the Late Middle Ages, psalters were the books most widely owned by wealthy lay persons. They were commonly used for learning to read. Many Psalters were richly illuminated, and they include some of the most spectacular surviving examples of medieval book art.

The English term (Old English) derives from Church Latin.
The Book of Psalms contains the bulk of the Divine Office of the Roman Catholic Church. 
The other books associated with it were the Lectionary, the Antiphonary, and Responsoriale, and the Hymnary.
In Late Modern English, psalter has mostly ceased to refer to the Book of Psalms (as the text of a book of the Bible) and mostly refers to the dedicated physical volumes containing this text.

Western Christianity

Dedicated psalters, as distinct from copies of the Psalms in other formats, e.g. as part of a full edition of the Old Testament, were first developed in the Latin West in the 6th century in Ireland and from about 700 on the continent.

The extensively illustrated Utrecht Psalter is one of the most important surviving Carolingian manuscripts and exercised a major influence on the later development of Anglo-Saxon art. In the Middle Ages psalters were among the most popular types of illuminated manuscripts, rivaled only by the Gospel Books, from which they gradually took over as the type of manuscript chosen for lavish illumination. From the late 11th century onwards they became particularly widespread - Psalms were recited by the clergy at various points in the liturgy, so psalters were a key part of the liturgical equipment in major churches.

Various different schemes existed for the arrangement of the Psalms into groups (see Latin Psalters). As well as the 150 Psalms, medieval psalters often included a calendar, a litany of saints, canticles from the Old and New Testaments, and other devotional texts. The selection of saints mentioned in the calendar and litany varied greatly and can often give clues as to the original ownership of the manuscript, since monasteries and private patrons alike would choose those saints that had particular significance for them.

Many psalters were lavishly illuminated with full-page miniatures as well as decorated initials. Of the initials the most important is normally the so-called "Beatus initial", based on the "B" of the words Beatus vir... ("Blessed is the man...") at the start of Psalm 1. This was usually given the most elaborate decoration in an illuminated psalter, often taking a whole page for the initial letter or first two words. Historiated initials or full-page illuminations were also used to mark the beginnings of the three major divisions of the Psalms, or the various daily readings, and may have helped users navigate to the relevant part of the text (medieval books almost never had page numbers). Many psalters, particularly from the 12th century onwards, included a richly decorated "prefatory cycle" – a series of full-page illuminations preceding the Psalms, usually illustrating the Passion story, though some also featured Old Testament narratives. Such images helped to enhance the book's status, and also served as aids to contemplation in the practice of personal devotions.

The psalter is also a part of either the Horologion or the breviary, used to say the Liturgy of the Hours in the Eastern and Western Christian worlds respectively.

Eastern Christianity

Non-illuminated psalters written in Coptic include some of the earliest surviving codices (bound books) altogether; the earliest Coptic psalter predates the earliest Western (Irish) one by more than a century.
The Mudil Psalter, the oldest complete Coptic psalter, dates to the 5th century. It was found in the Al-Mudil Coptic cemetery in a small town near Beni Suef, Egypt. The codex was in the grave of a young girl, open, with her head resting on it. Scholar John Gee has argued that this represents a cultural continuation of the ancient Egyptian tradition of placing the Book of the Dead in tombs and sarcophagi.

The Pahlavi Psalter is a fragment of a   Middle Persian translation of a Syriac version of the Book of Psalms, dated to the 6th or 7th century.

In Eastern Christianity (Eastern Orthodox, and in modern times also Byzantine Catholic), the Book of Psalms for liturgical purposes is divided into 20 kathismata or "sittings", for reading at Vespers and Matins. Kathisma means sitting, since the people normally sit during the reading of the psalms. Each kathisma is divided into three stases, from stasis, to stand, because each stasis ends with Glory to the Father..., at which everyone stands. The reading of the kathismata are so arranged that the entire psalter is read through in the course of a week (during Great Lent it is read through twice in a week). 
During Bright Week (Easter Week) there is no reading from the Psalms.  Orthodox psalters usually also contain the Biblical canticles, which are read at the canon of Matins during Great Lent.

The established Orthodox tradition of Christian burial has included reading the Psalms in the church throughout the vigil, where the deceased remains the night before the funeral (a reflection of the vigil of Holy Friday). Some Orthodox psalters also contain special prayers for the departed for this purpose. While the full tradition is showing signs of diminishing in practice, the psalter is still sometimes used during a wake.

Significant psalters

Manuscripts
See also :Category:Illuminated psalters

Early Medieval
Psalter of St. Germain of Paris, 6th century
Cathach of St. Columba, early 7th century
Faddan More Psalter
Vespasian Psalter, 2nd quarter of the 8th century
Montpellier Psalter
Chludov Psalter, 3rd quarter of the 9th century
Southampton Psalter
Utrecht Psalter, 9th century
Salaberga Psalter
Lothair Psalter, 840–855, British Library, Add. MS 37768
Stuttgart Psalter

High Medieval
Paris Psalter, 10th century
Ramsey Psalter
Gertrude Psalter, late 10th century with mid-11th century illuminations
Theodore Psalter, 1066, at the British Library
Psalterium Sinaiticum, 11th century
Melisende Psalter, circa 1135
Eadwine Psalter, c 1160
Harley Psalter
St. Albans Psalter
Winchester Psalter
Westminster Psalter
Felbrigge Psalter
Great Canterbury Psalter (Anglo-Catalan Psalter or Paris Psalter), c.1200 and 1340s
Psalter of St. Louis
Ormesby Psalter, start 13th century, Bodleian Library
Potocki Psalter, mid 13th century, now Warsaw with detached leaves elsewhere.

Late Medieval
Queen Mary Psalter
Luttrell Psalter
Gorleston Psalter
Macclesfield Psalter
Tickhill Psalter
Sofia Psalter
Tomich Psalter
232/15 Psalter at OPenn
Kiev Psalter of 1397
Psalter of Jean, Duc de Berry
Burnet Psalter

Early modern / Tudor period
Psalter of Henry VIII
Daskal Philip Psalter
1953‑128‑7 Liturgical psalter at OPenn

Printed editions
See also :Category:Psalters

Incunabula
Psalterium Romanum, 1457 [Mainz], Johann Fust and Peter Schöffer.   The first printed psalter.
Psalterium Benedictinum, 1459 [Mainz], Johann Fust and Peter Schöffer.   The second printed psalter.

Early modern editions
Coverdale's Psalter, 1535
Genevan Psalter, 1562
David's Psalter, a translation of the Book of Psalms into Polish by Jan Kochanowski, 1579
Scottish Psalter, 1635 and 1650
Bay Psalm Book, 1640, the first book printed in British North America. The Psalms in it are metrical translations into English.
New England Psalter

Modern editions
Grail Psalms, 1963, 2008
ICEL Psalter, 1995

See also

Metrical psalter
Book of Hours
Latin Psalters
Pahlavi Psalter
psalms

References

Further reading 
 Annie Sutherland,  English Psalms in the Middle Ages, 1300–1450, Oxford: Oxford University Press, 2015.

Christian genres
Medieval books
 
Types of illuminated manuscript